Intelligent Decision System (IDS) is a software package for multiple criteria decision analysis. It can handle hybrid types of uncertainty, including probability uncertainty, missing data, subjective judgements, interval data, and any combination of those types of uncertainty.  It uses belief function for problem modelling and the Evidential Reasoning Approach for attribute aggregation. The outcomes of the analysis include not only ranking of alternative courses of action based on average scores, but also aggregated performance distribution of each alternative for supporting informed and transparent decision making.

References

External links
 International Society on Multiple Criteria Decision Making
 Intelligent Decision System for Multiple Criteria Decision Making

Decision support systems
Multiple-criteria decision analysis